Joona Sotala, better known as Serral, is a Finnish professional StarCraft II player using the race Zerg. In 2018, Serral became the first non-Korean player to win the StarCraft II World Championship Series (WCS). He won every major non-Korean tournament in 2018, the 2018 Global Starcraft II League (GSL) vs. the World event and, ultimately, the 2018 WCS Global Finals. In 2022, he won the Intel Extreme Masters Katowice, and with the updated championship format he won the world championship of StarCraft II for the second time.

StarCraft II Career

Early career
Serral started competing at StarCraft II in 2012, but did not initially make a big splash. His first major tournament win would come in 2017 with the World Championship Series (WCS) Jönköping European Qualifier win, beating Zanster, Mana, ShoWTimE, Namshar and Elazer. He took 2nd place in the main event after beating Stephano, PtitDrogo and Elazer, but lost 3–4 to Neeb in the Finals. In 2017, he also won the European Qualifier for WCS Valencia, taking out Stephano, Bly, HeRoMaRinE and Elazer twice. During the main event, he was knocked out in the quarter finals by TRUE.

Serral won the European Qualifier for World Electronic Sports Games (WESG) by beating Clem, NightEnD, Starbuck, Majestic, uThermal, Elazer and Nerchio. In the main event, he did not lose a map during group play, beating ShoWTimE, Minato, Has, Elazer, Bly and Lambo. During playoffs he beat Neeb in the quarterfinals, but lost 0–3 to the eventual champion Maru.

2018

His first premier tournament win came in 2018 when he won WCS Leipzig, beating MaSa, Nerchio, SpeCial and ShoWTimE. He went on to win all 3 other major WCS tournaments in 2018, getting the first clean sweep, or Grand Slam, in WCS history. In WCS Austin, he defeated Kelazhur, HeRoMaRinE, Lambo and MaNa. In WCS Valencia, he beat Scarlett, Reynor, HeRoMaRinE and Has. In WCS Montreal, his domination of the 2018 WCS circuit was underscored by beating JonSnow, Scarlett, Lambo and Reynor. Serral also showed his prowess in the Korean scene at the 2018 Global Starcraft II League (GSL) vs. the World tournament where he took home a $26,901 prize over several of the strongest Korean players, beating Kelazhur, INnoVation, Dark and Stats.

The year end WCS Global Finals at Blizzcon featured 2018's eight best non-Koreans and eight best Koreans, including Cho "Maru" Seong Ju, who qualified for the Global Finals by making a clean sweep of GSL. Serral would win this tournament beating sOs, Zest, Dark, Rogue and Stats to become the first non-Korean to do so in the history of the StarCraft franchise.

2019
To start off the year 2019, Serral competed in the WCS Winter Europe Tournament, where he was expected to win. However, he was defeated 4-3 by 16-year-old Italian Zerg player, Reynor, in the Grand Finals in an incredibly close series. A month prior, he was also defeated by INnoVation in the WESG Finals. Not to mention, earlier that week he was eliminated in the Round of 8 of IEM Katowice to soO, the eventual winner of the tournament. After not losing a tournament in 2018, then falling short of victory in his first three tournaments of 2019, many started to question his dominance over the scene.

After the conclusion of WCS Winter, the Challengers for WCS Spring quickly started where Serral easily won, defeating ShoWTimE in the finals 4–2. During the main tournament, Serral quickly advanced to the playoff round. He defeated Lambo and TIME to advance to the semifinals. In the semifinal, he swept Reynor 3–0 to advance into the Grand Final—as a revenge for WCS Winter. In the Grand Final, Serral won 4-0 versus the Mexican Terran player SpeCial. His victory in WCS Spring was his Fifth WCS Circuit title.

However, he lost again to Reynor in the WCS Summer Grand Final 4–2. In his home tournament in Finland, Asus ROG Assembly 2019, he was projected to be one of the favorites to win the tournament, but lost to the strong Korean Protoss player Stats 2–3 in semifinals. Later during the summer, he won the GSL vs. the World tournament on Korean soil by defeating another Zerg player, Elazer, in the finals 4–2. The first time in the history no Korean players appeared in the final match. The win was Serral's second consecutive in the tournament. Serral won the last 2019 WCS Fall circuit tournament at Montreal against Reynor 4–1, and broke the previous WCS record by achieving an unprecedented map score of 17-1 - with his only map loss in the finals. Serral won the WCS season with 10,200 points, having already earned the top seed in Blizzcon 2019 with tournament victories in WCS Spring and WCS Fall tournaments. Despite of being one of the main favorites to win The Blizzcon 2019 he lost the semifinal match against his season long rival Reynor 2–3, the eventual tournament runner-up, after tight series of best of 5.

In the season's last premier tournament HomeStory Cup XX held at Tropical Islands Resort in Germany, Serral came back to the winning ways defeating Reynor twice (2–1 and 3–2) in the finals after winning the double-elimination loser bracket final against Innovation 0–3, to which he was first relegated from winners' round 2 by him with map score 3–1.

Serral played a crucial role in the Nationwars 2019 tournament when Team Finland (ZhuGeLiang, Serral, TheMusZero) defeated Team Korea in the final match 5–3.

For recognition and honor of Serral's accomplishments and continued success in StarCraft II esports, the President of Finland Sauli Niinistö invited him to take part to the traditional Independence Day Reception in the Presidential Palace, Helsinki, December 6, 2019.

2020
Serral faced Dark in the TSL6 finals where he lost 0–4.

2022
Serral faced former Italian world champion Reynor in the IEM Katowice Finals and beat him 4–3.

References

External links
Aligulac Statistics

1998 births
Living people
StarCraft players
Finnish esports players